James Alvin Wiggs (September 1, 1876 – January 20, 1963), nicknamed "Big Jim", was a right-handed pitcher in Major League Baseball for the Cincinnati Reds (1903) and Detroit Tigers (1905–06).

Born in Trondheim, Norway in 1876, Wiggs is one of three Norwegian major league baseball players in history. Wiggs was a big man at 6'4" tall.

In April 1903, Wiggs made his major league debut at age 26 with the Cincinnati Reds. He appeared in only two games for the Reds, pitching in only 5 innings with a 5.40 ERA.

In 1905, Wiggs got a second chance in the majors with the Detroit Tigers. He pitched in 11 games for the Tigers in the 1905 and 1906 seasons. In 1905, Wiggs pitched  innings (including 4 complete games) with a 3.27 earned run average (ERA) and a 3–3 record.

According to records of long-term holdouts by major league baseball players, Wiggs became the first player (in 1905) to hold out for at least of month of the season. 

In 1906, Wiggs pitched in only 10-1/3 innings and saw his ERA jump to 5.23—two points higher than the previous season. Wiggs pitched his final game for the Tigers on May 25, 1903, and did not play another game in the major leagues.

After being cut by the Tigers, Wiggs played for the Toledo Mud Hens in 1906.

In 1909, Wiggs pitched for the Oakland Oaks in the Pacific Coast League, and appeared in the longest shutout in professional baseball history, a 24-inning 1–0 loss to the San Francisco Seals. In what was called "the greatest game ever seen west of the Rockies," Wiggs struck out 11 batters, and held the Seals scoreless through 23 innings, but lost the 3-hour, 35-minute game when the Oaks allowed an unearned run in the 24th inning. Cack Henley pitched the complete game shutout for the Seals. ("Runs, Hits, and an Era: The Pacific Coast League, 1903-58," By Paul J Zingg)

Jimmy Wiggs died in Xenia, Ohio in 1963 at age 86.

References

External links

Major League Baseball pitchers
Detroit Tigers players
Major League Baseball players from Norway
Sportspeople from Trondheim
American people of Norwegian descent
1876 births
1963 deaths
London Tecumsehs (baseball) players
Minneapolis Millers (baseball) players
St. Joseph Saints players
Helena Senators players
Portland Green Gages players
Salt Lake City Elders players
San Francisco Pirates players
New Orleans Pelicans (baseball) players
Altoona Mountaineers players
Oakland Oaks (baseball) players
Montreal Royals players
Seattle Giants players